Herbert James Mntangi (born 16 October 1950) is a Tanzanian CCM politician and Member of Parliament for Muheza constituency since 2000.

References 

1950 births
Living people
Chama Cha Mapinduzi MPs
Tanzanian MPs 2000–2005
Tanzanian MPs 2005–2010
Tanzanian MPs 2010–2015
Tambaza Secondary School alumni
University of Dar es Salaam alumni
Alumni of the University of Salford